Kosmos 526 ( meaning Cosmos 526), known before launch as DS-P1-Yu No.61, was a Soviet satellite which was launched in 1972 as part of the Dnepropetrovsk Sputnik programme. It was a  spacecraft, which was built by the Yuzhnoye Design Bureau, and was used as a radar calibration target for anti-ballistic missile tests.

Kosmos 526 was successfully launched into low Earth orbit at 10:39:57 UTC on 25 October 1972. The launch took place from Site 133/1 at the Plesetsk Cosmodrome, and used a Kosmos-2I 63SM carrier rocket. Upon reaching orbit, the satellite was assigned its Kosmos designation, and received the International Designator 1972-084A. The North American Aerospace Defense Command assigned it the catalogue number 06254.

Kosmos 526 was the fifty-ninth of seventy nine DS-P1-Yu satellites to be launched, and the fifty-third of seventy two to successfully reach orbit. It remained in orbit until it decayed and reentered the atmosphere on 8 April 1973.

See also

1972 in spaceflight

References

Kosmos satellites
Spacecraft launched in 1972
Dnepropetrovsk Sputnik program